Pulsatilla cernua, the narrow-leaf pasque-flower is a species of plant in the family Ranunculaceae Pulsatilla cernua is a perennial plant that can grow to be about 0.2 m or 8 in tall.  This plant has six dark red/purple flowers and has tiny white, silky villose hairs. Pulsatilla cernua flowers from April to May, and then the seeds ripen from May to June. P. cernua is insect pollinated. This plant has both male and female parts, which means it is a hermaphrodite. Most parts of this plant are not edible, except for the roots and leaves.


Taxonomy 
Pulsatilla cernua is a member of the family Ranunculaceae, the buttercup family. This family consists mainly of herbs, a few aquatics, and some vines or shrubs. The genus Pulsatilla has 33 herbaceous perennial species that grow in meadows and prairies in Asia, Europe, and North America. Pulsatilla is derived from “pasakh”, which is the Hebrew word for Passover.

Habitat 
Pulsatilla cernua is native Eastern Asia including Korea, Japan, north-east China, and parts of far-east Russia. This plant is commonly found in the low mountains of Japan as well as grassy slopes in the northern parts of China. Pulsatilla cernua prefers moist soil, which is why it is found in lower parts of the mountains or on slopes. The soil must also be sandy and loamy and be well drained, or else the Pulsatilla cernua will not live and grow. Pulsatilla cernua can also grow in acidic, basic, or neutral soil. It can even manage to grow in very alkaline soils. This plant also cannot grow in shady areas, and it must be in a position where it is almost always in the sun's light.

References 

Perennial plants
cernua